Tom Bidwell is a British screenwriter and playwright.

Early life
Raised in Lancashire, Bidwell developed cancer in his shoulder at the age of 15, which was successfully treated. He completed his GCSEs and later obtained a degree in English and Drama at university.

Career
After writing plays, Bidwell got his break through a BBC Radio 4 play, later adapted into a 2009 short film, Wish 143. The story focuses on a terminally ill teenager who wishes to lose his virginity. It would go on to be nominated for an Academy Award in 2011 for Best Live Action Short Film. He was awarded a place on the BBC Writer's Academy, a programme designed to train new writers for their long running television series. He went on to write for all four of the BBC's popular continuing dramas: Doctors, EastEnders, Casualty and its spinoff, Holby City.

Bidwell went on to work on the E4 teen comedy-drama My Mad Fat Diary. The series was nominated for multiple BAFTA awards. Bidwell was approached by MTV to work on an American remake of the series, which was not made. In July 2014, it was announced that BBC would be airing a new animated serial of Watership Down, helmed by Bidwell. The series was a co-production between BBC and Netflix, with a budget of £20 million. The drama won a Daytime Emmy Award for Outstanding Special Class Animated Program.

On 20 December 2018, it was announced that Netflix was planning a new adventure series with Bidwell, based on the Baker Street Irregulars from the Sherlock Holmes novels. Bidwell described the program as "my dream project and my oldest idea" and it takes a different view of Holmes and his relationship to the Irregulars, which has the band of street kids solve cases. The eight-episode The Irregulars premiered on 26 March 2021. Bidwell also scripted an adaptation of The Velveteen Rabbit.

References

External links
 

Living people
21st-century British screenwriters
21st-century British male writers
British dramatists and playwrights
British television writers
British male screenwriters
British soap opera writers
Year of birth missing (living people)